Hetzler is a surname. Notable people with the surname include:

Mark Hetzler (born 1968), American trombonist 
Theodore Hetzler (1875–1945), American banker

See also
Hutzler